Arley and Fillongley  railway station was a station on the Midland Railway, which operated in the Midland county of Warwickshire, in England.

History
The station was opened by the Midland Railway, and was absorbed by the London Midland and Scottish Railway during the Grouping of 1923. Passing on to the London Midland Region of British Railways on nationalisation in 1948, it was then closed by the British Transport Commission.

Present day
The station master's house still exists as a private residence. Trains on the Birmingham to Peterborough Line still pass the site.

References
 
 
 Station on navigable O.S. map

External links
 Warwickshire Railways entry

Disused railway stations in Warwickshire
Former Midland Railway stations
Railway stations in Great Britain opened in 1864
Railway stations in Great Britain closed in 1960